Cheirurus (from Greek χείρ, cheir meaning "hand" and ουρά, oura meaning "tail") is a genus of phacopid trilobites that lived from the Ordovician to the Devonian. Its remains have been found in Africa, Asia, Australia, Europe, and North America.  Cheirurus is the type genus of Cheiruridae.

References

 Trilobite: Eyewitness to Evolution by Richard Fortey

External links

 Trilobites.info
Cheirurus in the Paleobiology Database

Cheiruridae
Phacopida genera
Ordovician trilobites
Silurian trilobites
Devonian trilobites
Trilobites of Africa
Trilobites of Asia
Trilobites of Oceania
Trilobites of Europe
Trilobites of North America
Middle Devonian genus extinctions
Paleozoic life of Ontario
Paleozoic life of Quebec